Franklin is an animated preschool educational children's television series, based on the Franklin the Turtle books by Brenda Clark and Paulette Bourgeois, and produced by Nelvana. It was followed up by a CGI adaptation, Franklin and Friends.

The animated series has also produced several television films: Franklin and the Green Knight (2000), Franklin's Magic Christmas (2001) and Back to School with Franklin (2003), alongside a theatrical movie: Franklin and the Turtle Lake Treasure (2006), all of which were produced by Nelvana.

Plot
Franklin focuses on the eponymous growing young turtle who, as his television stories and books always begin, "could count by twos and tie his shoes". He goes to school, lives in a small village called Woodland with his friends, and has many adventures playing and learning in the world around him, sometimes with the helping hand of an adult such as his parents, Mr. and Mrs. Turtle. Franklin likes swimming, arts and crafts (especially drawing), and loves shoofly pie. He's been known to be afraid of the dark and thunderstorms. Franklin has a best friend named Bear, as well as a blue blanket and a blue plush dog with shorter purple ears named Sam. In earlier seasons, he sleeps with his blanket and Sam. When Franklin is scared by thunderstorms, Sam and his blue blanket help keep him calm.

Episodes

Characters and neighbourhood
The main character of the series is Franklin Turtle himself. All episodes and films focus on Franklin as the main character. Almost all events are presented directly from his point of view with some exceptions. There are no stories in which Franklin is absent, though sometimes certain other characters may take more of a focus.

Franklin's family includes his parents, Mr. and Mrs. Turtle and his younger sister Harriet. Mr. and Mrs. Turtle are presented as gentle and loving parents who provide direction and guidance for Franklin, as well as a reasonable discipline when needed. His sister, Harriet, was born in the film Franklin and the Green Knight and was featured in stories in the fifth and sixth seasons of the program.
Unlike in the real world and in the world of the Arthur books and Arthur TV series by Marc Brown where the law that prohibits marriage between siblings and cousins and family members exists, in Franklin's world where the people are animals of different species, the laws of marriage are different and marriage between twin siblings is legal in Franklin's world.  While most of the characters are animals of different species, and some have parents who are married twin siblings and share the same family, Franklin has parents who are not married siblings and are from different families and are of different ages and years apart.  Franklin's extended family includes his paternal grandmother, who lives close by, as well as his maternal grandparents, who live on a remote farm (As shown in "Franklin's Magic Christmas") who are both the same age unlike Franklin's parents.

In the film Franklin and the Turtle Lake Treasure, his paternal aunt Lucy and her goddaughter Sam chose to settle in Woodland as well. Sam has parents but they let her stay in Woodland so she could visit her Godmother, Lucy. And in the new CGI series, his paternal Aunt Teeny (Aunt T or Aunt Turtle) is introduced. In later episodes, Franklin's maternal aunt and uncle and his maternal cousin will be introduced.

Franklin's parents and Mr. and Mrs. Heron are the only couples in Woodland to be of other ages. Most of the married couples in Woodland have the two people of the same age. And most couples in Woodland have married twin siblings.

Franklin's best friend is Bear, who is a bear that loves to eat and, in later seasons, has a sister named Beatrice. His other close friend is Snail, a garden snail who considers Franklin to be his best friend. One of Franklin's other friends that appears most often in the series is Beaver. Franklin's other friends that appear most often in the series are Goose, Rabbit, Fox, Badger, Raccoon and Skunk. He is taught by Mr. Owl, though this character was temporarily replaced by Miss Koala in the film Back to School with Franklin when Mr. Owl was called away on a family emergency.

Goose's family included a mother and father who are both the same age but are revealed to be divorced in Franklin and Friends. Goose's large family as seen in Franklin Migrates includes her paternal grandmother (whom she is called Granny) and her maternal grandfather (whom he is called Grandpa) as well as her maternal aunt and uncle who are married twin siblings and are older than Mrs. Goose, Goose's mother and her younger maternal cousin Giselle.

Other characters are seen on the show with less frequency, sometimes only appearing in one or a few episodes.

Woodland
Franklin and his friends live in a small, animal-resident village in eastern North America known as Woodland. The village is small enough that most residents know one another and meet on a regular basis. There is a small shopping district, some roads (with every bit of traffic), and at least one community schoolhouse. It has been implied that Woodland is located in the province of Manitoba, however, this has never been officially confirmed.

 Turtle Household – Franklin, his parents Mr. and Mrs. Turtle, and Harriet's home.
 Granny Turtle  – Franklin's paternal grandmother who talks a lot and has a nice attic.
 Great-Grandpa Turtle  – Shown once on Franklin's Magic Christmas when Grandma was telling a story about him.
 Great-Grandma and Great-Grandpa Turtle – The parents of Granny who died in a wildfire. Great-Grandma was a great berry picker and Great-Grandpa was a great fisherman.
 Oakwood School – The schoolhouse in Woodland where Mr. Owl works and where Franklin goes to school.
 Shopping District – Woodland is known to have the strongest shopping district with an ice cream shop, Mr. Mole's hardware store, a pharmacy, a grocery market, a coffee shop, a bookstore, and more. Franklin and his friends sometimes travel here with their parents, with each other, or even by themselves.
 Tree Fort - A treehouse Franklin's friends built in the episode "Franklin's Fort". At the time, Franklin was afraid of heights but got over his fear at the end of the episode after he helped a tiny bird. Franklin and his friends would then use it for their activities and to hang out. In the episode "Franklin Plays It Safe", it got broke due to falling out of its tree when the branch that was holding it broke. However, a new one was built at the end.
 Pond – Franklin and his friends often hang out by the pond, which is attached to a stream. They sometimes go swimming, sit by the pond, or participate in other activities.
Woods – Woodland is surrounded on at least one end by forests. A character named Gopher who appeared in the film Franklin and the Green Knight is known to live here. In Franklin and the Green Knight, Franklin and Snail had an adventure here. They explored deep into the woods where they met several characters and found magic cherry blossoms.
 Oakwood Ravine – Located within the woods and connected distantly to the playground. The only area in Woodland that is shown to add poison ivy.
 Nature Trail – The Nature Trail is a trail that has a picnic ground within it, as well as the Monarch Meadow and Blueberry Hill Lookout. Franklin and Bear went on a hiking trip on the trail once. They expected to find monarch butterflies in the meadow but found caterpillars instead. There is a pond here as well. Franklin and Bear try to skip stones in it, but the stones sink.
 Village Park – Kids go skateboarding here.
 Playground – For the little kids such as Harriet and Beatrice. It has a slide, swings and monkey bars. Harriet, Kit and Beatrice all enjoy playing here.
 Tamarack Play Park – An amusement park area never seen on the program, but referenced. When Franklin is unable to travel there with all his friends, he creates "Turtle Play Park".
 Faraway Farm – The farm far away from Woodland where Franklin's maternal grandparents live. Franklin and his family spend Christmas here with his maternal grandparents in the TV special Franklin's Magic Christmas.
 Turtle Lake – An area featured only in the TV special Franklin and the Turtle Lake Treasure. Franklin's Granny lived in this area but lost her home and parents in a fire.
 Woodland Town Hall – The Woodland Town Hall is used to hold the production of Sleeping Beauty played by Franklin and his class in "Franklin's Starring Role".
 Thrill Hill – A steep hill that the older kids in town like to skateboard down. Franklin ends up skateboarding down it accidentally and then is dared to do it again. At first, he agrees but ends up not taking the dare.
 Blueberry Hill – A hill within a nature park that has the biggest view, when it's not too cloudy. The name may be a reference to the song.

Sports and games
Baseball is seen more often in earlier seasons, with only sporadic appearances in later episodes. Hockey and soccer are favoured as sports to play. Once, when Franklin and Bear went to sign up for football, spaces had run out, so they were signed up for basketball instead.

Owing to the show's Canadian roots, ice hockey has an important place in the Franklin universe. It is featured in several stories, including one in which Skunk is taught by Franklin and Bear how to play. Franklin also gets to meet a couple of his professional hockey icons in the fifth and sixth seasons of the program.

In addition to sports, the characters enjoy a lot of games and activities. Franklin becomes his school's chess champion. Harriet and Beatrice enjoy playing tag and hide-and-seek. And Franklin and his friends enjoy playing knights.

Production

Development
The development design of Franklin the Turtle for the animated series character, was the achievement of Canadian Animation artist and Illustrator Kurt Lehner, which he worked on during his time at Nelvana studio in 1997. These designs were studies taken directly from the Franklin the Turtle book series itself. Though Lehner did not continue to work with the "series" design team which was hired after the development process, at that time he was given the privilege of also designing Beaver, Rabbit, and Skunk as well.

In May 2004, new episodes of the series began airing on the Canadian network, Treehouse TV. Franklin and many of his friends had new voice actors in these new adventures, including award-winning American actor Grant Eubanks. Many of the show's strongest writers and staff members remained on board, however. These new stories saw Franklin facing a flood, worrying about the old treehouse, and earning a badge in a group called the Woodland Trailblazers. For the sixth season Funbag and other animation studios joined in the development of Franklin. The most recent film in the series is Franklin and the Turtle Lake Treasure. The film was written by John van Bruggen and directed by Dominique Monféry. The 76-minute film premiered in theatres in 2006 and had its debut on Noggin on New Year's Eve, 2007, as part of a celebration of the network's conversion to a 24/7 format.

Format
Franklin is traditionally animated with some computer aid, especially in the later seasons. Franklin is closed-captioned.

Franklin mostly aired with two 11-minute stories, except on CBC in Canada, which splits the stories apart and shows one at a time. The Franklin DVD and video releases include individual stories grouped together as part of a theme, rather than complete episodes. Unlike many animated children's programs, Franklin has no interstitial segments or end-tags featuring the characters. The scenes shown in the animated opening introduction were changed after the show's first season. Many of these scenes featured Otter, a character who left the series early in the first season and was only seen once more in later seasons.

Differences in the colouring of the cartoon can be spotted from season to season. The more recent feature films, most noticeably Back to School with Franklin have a somewhat different look from the television series. The film Franklin and the Turtle Lake Treasure had considerably higher production values, with more colour differentiation between the other turtles, higher quality animation, an overall brighter look, and prettily painted backgrounds.

Release

Broadcast
In Canada, the series aired on CBC Television, Family Channel, and Treehouse TV.

In the United States, it aired on CBS as part of their Saturday-morning CBS Kidshow block from 1998 to 1999. Then it aired on Nick Jr. on CBS for 2 years from September 16, 2000, to September 7, 2002. It also aired on Nickelodeon as part of the Nick Jr. television block from January 11, 1999, to July 30, 2004. It even aired on Noggin (now Nick Jr.) from October 4, 1999, until the channel was re-branded as Nick Jr. on September 28, 2009 at 6:00 am and continued to air reruns until June 14, 2013. Seven years later, it moved on Qubo and aired from January 1 (New Year's Day), 2021, until February 26 of that same year when some affiliates abruptly switched that night to other Katz networks, two days before others were switched automatically at the end of the same second month's last day at the master control level, at which point the network ceased operations.

In the United Kingdom, it aired on Sky One from March 21, 1998, until May 27, 2000, Channel 4 from November 1, 1998, until August 31, 2004, Tiny Living from April 2001 to May 2002, Nick Jr. from 1999 to 2008, Five in 2004, and Tiny Pop in 2012 (in which it was dubbed with British voice actors on those channels, replacing the original Canadian soundtrack) in 2007. It has also been broadcast in India on Pogo, along with another animated series, Angelina Ballerina.

In Australia, it aired on ABC.

In The Arab World, it aired on Spacetoon from 2003 to 2015.

Home media

Reception

The show was well-received by critics and parents. Joly Herman of Common Sense Media stated in a review, "Franklin is a show that takes for granted respect for elders and vice versa. There's no whining, fighting, yelling, provocation, or aggravation. Franklin ultimately sets a good example of responsible TV programming, and it is a rare show that celebrates the innocence of childhood."

In other media

Books and movies
Franklin television stories are mostly based on books in the original Franklin Adventure series. The practice of adapting television stories from books was dropped in the program's second season, though elements and dialogue from some of the books are incorporated into later stories. Although, many Franklin television stories have been made into books in the Franklin TV Storybook and Franklin First Readers series. Usually written by Sharon Jennings, these adaptations are shortened versions of what is seen on TV and may contain non-canon material.

On September 11, 2000, Franklin's younger sister Harriet was introduced in the direct-to-video and DVD movie Franklin and the Green Knight. The two shared an adventure on November 24, 2001, in Franklin's Magic Christmas. Back to School with Franklin was released direct-to-video on August 19, 2003, which involved Harriet befriending Beaver's younger brother Kit, and new character Mrs. Koala introduced as a teacher to Franklin and his friends.

Live tours
Franklin has been seen in numerous touring stage shows, including "Franklin's Big Adventure," "Franklin's Class Concert," "Franklin's Family Christmas Concert," and "Franklin's Carnival Of Animals." Produced by Koba Entertainment and presented by Paquin Entertainment, these stage shows featured a number of songs including "Come See the World," "What I Do in the Morning" and "The Dinosaur Song".

In 2009, a new touring show, "Franklin and The Adventures of the Noble Knights", was developed, and is currently touring in France. The show is also produced by Koba Entertainment, and presented by Paquin Entertainment. The Director/Choreographer is Patti Caplette. This show toured in Canada in 2010. A soundtrack CD featuring the songs from the programme is now available.

Video games
Three educational video games, Franklin's Activity Center, Franklin's Reading World and Franklin Learns Math are published by Sanctuary Woods, Multimedia Corporation and released from PC in 1995 and 1996. In 2000, Nelvana and Knowledge Adventure, Inc. developed two PC games, Franklin the Turtle Goes to School and Franklin the Turtle's Clubhouse. In 2004, Nelvana also developed an educational PC game called Franklin the Turtle After School. Between 2005 and 2006, The Game Factory released Franklin the Turtle and Franklin's Great Adventures in 2005, and Franklin's Birthday Surprise on April 18, 2006.

CGI series

On September 27, 2010, Nelvana announced that it had begun production on a new all-CGI Franklin series called Franklin and Friends. The series has been ordered for 52 episodes and the characters that return in the series are Bear, Fox, Rabbit, Beaver, Goose, Snail and, naturally, Franklin himself. Additionally, the series features a new regular character, Franklin's paternal aunt named Aunt T., described as "quirky." The series "features special themes including fun mysteries, Woodland events and outdoor activities." This is a Canada-Singapore joint venture between Nelvana and Infinite Frameworks Pte. Ltd.

The series officially premiered on Treehouse TV on March 4, 2011. A US release date had been announced on the Nick Jr. Franklin webpage for February 13, 2012. It also premiered in Singapore on Mediacorp on February 15, 2012.

References

External links

 Franklin and Friends web page at TreeHouseTV.com
 TV.com Franklin guide
 
 Toronto's Franklin Park
 Franklin (noggin.com – Web Archive)
 Franklin on TV Tropes

1990s Canadian animated television series
1990s Canadian children's television series
1990s French animated television series
1990s preschool education television series
1997 Canadian television series debuts
1997 French television series debuts
2000s Canadian animated television series
2000s Canadian children's television series
2000s French animated television series
2000s preschool education television series
2004 Canadian television series endings
2004 French television series endings
Animated preschool education television series
Animated television series about children
Animated television series about siblings
Animated television series about turtles
Canadian children's animated adventure television series
Canadian children's animated fantasy television series
Canadian preschool education television series
Canadian television shows based on children's books
CBC Kids original programming
Elementary school television series
English-language television shows
Family Channel (Canadian TV network) original programming
Franklin the Turtle (books)
French children's animated adventure television series
French children's animated fantasy television series
French preschool education television series
French television shows based on children's books
Nick Jr. original programming
Television series by Nelvana
Television shows filmed in Toronto
Treehouse TV original programming